Walter Lohmann (21 July 1911 – 18 April 1993) was a German professional cyclist who was active between 1932 and 1957. He won the UCI Motor-paced World Championships in 1937.

Biography
As a teenager he was interested in football and athletics and attended a trade school. In 1927, he started training in road racing. In 1932, he won the Berlin–Cottbus–Berlin, Bochum-Münster-Bochum, and Dortmund races and finished in sixth place in the UCI Road World Championships. Two years later he won the six-day race of Berlin and changed to motor-paced racing. In this discipline, between 1935 and 1953 he won 10 national titles and finished three times in second place. He also won the UCI Motor-paced World Championships in 1937 and finished in second place in 1938 and 1952. 

In 1954, he was suspended for approximately one year after a quarrel with Gustav Kilian, a cyclist, and Otto Weckerling, the manager of a six-day race, whom he accused of manipulating the competition. On 24 October 1955, aged 44, he set two world records: in 100 km (at 1:03'40") and in one-hour race (at 96.016 km). On 16 September 1957, Lohmann drove his farewell race at the velodrom of Frankfurt.

After retirement he opened a restaurant in the center of Bochum, he also owned a gasoline station. For a few months he worked as a national head coach, but resigned because of disputes with the German Cycling Federation. In 1979, he received serious injuries in a skiing accident and required nursing care from his wife Irmgard. He died in 1993.

References

1911 births
1993 deaths
German male cyclists
Sportspeople from Bochum
UCI Track Cycling World Champions (men)
German track cyclists
Cyclists from North Rhine-Westphalia